Robert Lee Independent School District is a public school district based in Robert Lee, Texas (USA) covers much of western Coke County

Academic achievement
In 2009, the school district was rated "recognized" by the Texas Education Agency.

Schools
The district has two campuses - 
Robert Lee Junior High/High School (Grades 7-12)
Robert Lee Elementary School (Grades PK-6)

Special programs

Athletics
Robert Lee High School plays six-man football.

See also

List of school districts in Texas

References

External links
Robert Lee ISD

School districts in Coke County, Texas